Albert Hustin (1882–1967) was a Belgian medical doctor.

Hustin was born in Ethe and died in Uccle (Uccle Brussels – Belgium).

In 1914, he was the first person to successfully practice non-direct blood transfusions with sodium citrate used as an anticoagulant. He added sodium citrate and glucose to the blood to preserve it, and stop it from clotting.

References

1882 births
1967 deaths
20th-century Belgian physicians
People from Virton